"Pikanchi" (stylized as PIKA☆NCHI) is the ninth single of the Japanese boy band Arashi. The single was released in two editions: a regular edition with the song and its instrumental and a limited edition with ", the insert song used throughout the movie, and a deluxe cover.

Single information
Debuting at the top of the charts in 2002, the single was re-released in 2008, along with "Nice na Kokoroiki", and re-entered the Oricon charts. "Pikanchi" was used as the theme song for the movie Pikanchi: Life is Hard Dakedo Happy starring Arashi in their first movie together.

Track listing

Charts

References

External links
 Pikanchi product information 
 Pikanchi Oricon profile 

Arashi songs
2002 singles
Oricon Weekly number-one singles
Japanese film songs
2002 songs
J Storm singles